Büyüksofulu is a village in Aladağ district of  Adana Province, Turkey. It is situated in the Taurus Mountains to the west of Aladağ and to the north of Adana. In addition to agriculture, forestry and chrome mining are among the village revenues. The population of the village  is 1735 as of 2012.

References

Villages in Aladağ District